Maria Mylona (born 10 August 1974) is a Greek sailor. She competed in the Europe event at the 1996 Summer Olympics, where she ranked 22nd out of 28 competitors.

References

External links
 

1974 births
Living people
Greek female sailors (sport)
Olympic sailors of Greece
Sailors at the 1996 Summer Olympics – Europe
Place of birth missing (living people)